Asu Kepaoa (born 2 February 2000) is a professional rugby league footballer who plays as a er and  for the Wests Tigers in the National Rugby League.

Playing career

2020
Kepaoa made his first grade debut in round 13 of the 2020 NRL season for the Wests Tigers against Newcastle.

In round 18 against South Sydney, he scored his first try in the top grade as Wests were defeated 26-24 at Bankwest Stadium.

The following week, he scored his first double in the top grade as Wests were defeated 50-22 by Melbourne.

2021
On 18 April, it was announced that he would miss the remainder of the 2021 NRL season with a knee injury which occurred during the club's loss against South Sydney in round 6 of the competition.

2022
On 24 July, in the round 19 match against the North Queensland Cowboys at Queensland Country Bank Stadium, Kepaoa cost his side victory when he was determined by the video referee to have obstructed North Queensland winger Kyle Feldt following a short kick-off in the final second of game time, at which point the Tigers led 26–25. The Tigers lost the match 26–27 after Valentine Holmes booted the match-winning penalty goal for North Queensland on the full-time siren.
In round 24, Kepaoa was sent to the sin bin for a high tackle in the final minute of the match against St. George Illawarra. Zac Lomax then kicked a penalty goal for St. George Illawarra which won the game 24-22 and meant that the Wests Tigers would finish with the Wooden Spoon for the first time in their history.

Controversy
On 31 January 2021, Kepaoa and fellow NRL player Zane Musgrove were detained by the police after allegedly abusing officers and refusing to move on from outside of the Coogee Bay Hotel.

They were released without charge, however Kepaoa was issued with an infringement notice.  The matter was then passed on to the NRL Integrity Unit.

References

External links
Wests Tigers profile

2000 births
Living people
New Zealand rugby league players
New Zealand sportspeople of Samoan descent
Rugby league players from Auckland
Rugby league wingers
Wests Tigers players